Émile Charles Achard (24 July 1860 – 7 August 1944) was a French internist born in Paris. 

In Paris, he served as médecin des hôpitaux (from 1893), later becoming a professor of general pathology and therapeutics. In 1910, he was appointed professor of internal medicine at the University of Paris (Hôpital Beaujon). During his career, he also served as a physician at Hôpital Cochin.

In 1896, along with Raoul Bensaude (1866–1938), he identified a disease he called paratyphoid fever. They were able to isolate the cause of illness to a microbe now classified as salmonella paratyphi B. 

A postmenopausal condition known as "diabetic-bearded woman syndrome" is sometimes referred to as "Achard-Thiers syndrome", and the eponymous "Achard syndrome" is a disorder characterized by arachnodactyly,  brachycephaly, a receding lower jaw and joint laxity in the extremities.  

In 1897, along with internist Joseph Castaigne (1871–1951), he developed a urinary test using methylene blue dye for examining the excretory function of the kidneys. The procedure was to become known as the "Achard-Castaigne test". With Castaigne and Georges Maurice Debove (1845-1920), he published Manuel des maladies du tube digestif.

References

 Emile Achard @ Who Named It

1860 births
1944 deaths
Scientists from Paris
Academic staff of the University of Paris
Members of the French Academy of Sciences
French pathologists
French internists